Akash Sharma (born 10 October 1992) is an Indian cricketer. He made his first-class debut for Services in the 2018–19 Ranji Trophy on 12 November 2018.

References

External links
 

1992 births
Living people
Indian cricketers
Services cricketers
Place of birth missing (living people)